The Van Rompuy Government was the federal government of Belgium from 30 December 2008 until 15 November 2009. Herman Van Rompuy was nominated as the first President of the European Council and resigned shortly after as Premier. It took office when the Flemish Christian Democrat Herman Van Rompuy (Christian Democratic and Flemish, CD&V) was sworn in as Prime Minister after the Leterme I Government fell on 22 December 2008.

On 18 December 2008, Yves Leterme offered his government's resignation to King Albert after a scandal erupted surrounding the investigation of the sale of the failing Fortis bank to BNP Paribas. Leterme, Jo Vandeurzen, and Didier Reynders were accused of violating the separation of powers by trying to influence the Court of Appeals and of exerting improper influence by the First Chairman of the Court of Cassation. Three days later the resignation was accepted by the king. 

To be official, the Van Rompuy I government needed a vote of confidence from the Chamber of Representatives. It received the vote of confidence on 2 January 2009.

The government was succeeded on 24 November 2009 by the Leterme II Government.

Composition
The Van Rompuy I Government comprises 15 ministers and seven secretaries of state. Its initial composition is as follows:

Government reshuffle
On 17 July 2009, as a consequence of the regional elections, the government was reshuffled:
 Karel De Gucht (VLD), who was appointed European Commissioner was succeeded by Yves Leterme (CD&V) as minister of Foreign Affairs
 Guido De Padt (VLD) was replaced as minister of the interior by Annemie Turtelboom (VLD); De Padt was appointed government commissioner for the internal audit of the federal government.
 Guy Vanhengel (VLD) entered the government as Deputy Prime Minister and Minister of the Budget
 Melchior Wathelet jr. stayed on as state secretary for the budget but received the competences Asylum and immigration which were previously held by Minister Turtelboom.
 Marie Arena (PS) was replaced as minister of Pensions and Large Cities by Michel Daerden
 Julie Fernandez-Fernandez (PS) was replaced as state secretary for Disabled Persons by Jean-Marc Delizée (PS). Delizée in turn was replaced as state secretary for the Fight against Poverty by Philippe Courard (PS). Courard also received the competences of social integration from Arena.

See also
2007–2011 Belgian political crisis

References

Belgian governments
2008 establishments in Belgium
2009 disestablishments in Belgium
Cabinets established in 2008
Cabinets disestablished in 2009